Cajigal is a municipality of Sucre, Venezuela. The capital is Yaguaraparo. As of 2015, Cajigal had a population of 25,225.

References

Municipalities of Sucre (state)